Mount Hawkes is, at , the highest mountain along the Washington Escarpment, standing at the east side of Jones Valley in the Neptune Range of the Pensacola Mountains, Antarctica. It was discovered and photographed on January 13, 1956, in the course of the trans-Antarctic nonstop plane flight by personnel of U.S. Navy Operation Deep Freeze I from McMurdo Sound to the Weddell Sea and return. It was named by the Advisory Committee on Antarctic Names for Commander William M. Hawkes of the U.S. Navy, who was the co-pilot of the P2V-2N Neptune aircraft making this flight. The Hawkes Heights are also named for Hawkes, who was assigned to Air Development Squadron Six (VX-6) in 1955–56.

References

Mountains of Queen Elizabeth Land
Pensacola Mountains